The Fryderyk is the annual award in Polish music. Its name refers to the original Polish spelling variant of Polish composer Frédéric Chopin's first name. Its status in the Polish public can be compared to the American Grammy and the UK's BRIT Award. 
Officially created in 1994 and presented for the first time in 1995, the award was initially conferred by the Polish Society of the Phonographic Industry (Związek Producentów Audio-Video, ZPAV). Since 1999, nominees and winners have been selected by a body called Phonographic Academy (Akademia Fonograficzna) which by now consists of nearly 1000 artists, journalists and music industry professionals. Voting is anonymous and takes place in two rounds: In the first round, all Academy members can nominate five artists in each category, in the second round, members can vote for one candidate in each category from the most successful nominees established in the first round.

The Fryderyk statuette is reminiscent of the Academy Awards' "Oscar", but with wings, arms stretched backwards, and with headphones. The statuette was designed and created by Dorota Dziekiewicz-Pilich.

Categories 
The categories in which Fryderyk awards are presented have been steadily extended and modified since its inception in 1994. There are three main sections – popular music, classical music, and jazz. At present (2010) the following categories are used:

Popular music

Best Music Production
Best Album Design
Composer of the Year 
Author of the Year
Best Foreign Album 
Album of the Year – Folk/World Music 
Album of the Year – Sung Poetry 
Album of the Year – Rock
Album of the Year – Blues
Album of the Year – Heavy Metal 
Album of the Year – Club Music
Album of the Year – Hip-Hop/R&B 
Album of the Year – Alternative 
Album of the Year – Pop
New Face of Fonography
Group of the Year 
Female Vocalist of the Year 
Male Vocalist of the Year 
Video of the Year 
Song of the Year

Classical music
Best Choral and Oratorias Music Album
Best Early and Baroque Music Album
Best Chamber Music Album 
Best Symphonic and Concerto Music Album
Best Solo Music Album
Best Contemporary Music Album
Best Vocal Recital Music Album
Best Opera, Operetta and Ballet Music Album
Best Debut Album
Composer of the Year
Most Outstanding Polish Music Recording

Jazz
Album of the Year
New Act of the Year
Act of the Year

Most successful artists
As of 2009, the most successful artists in the ten-year-history of the Fryderyks are (nominations and awards for 2009 not included):

Popular music
Kasia Nosowska (of Hey): 21 awards, 53 nominations,
Grzegorz Ciechowski (of Republika): 11 awards, 24 nominations,
Kayah: 8 awards, 32 nominations,
Grzegorz Turnau: 8 awards, 19 nominations,
Myslovitz: 7 awards, 30 nominations,
Raz, Dwa, Trzy: 7 awards, 17 nominations,
Ania Dąbrowska: 7 awards, 15 nominations
Note: Awards for individual artists may include awards for their groups and vice versa.

Classical music
Warsaw National Philharmonic Orchestra: 5 awards, 22 nominations,
Sinfonia Varsovia: 5 awards, 22 nominations,
Janusz Olejniczak: 5 awards, 12 nominations,
Jerzy Maksymiuk: 4 awards, 12 nominations,
Jadwiga Rappé: 4 awards, 9 nominations.

Jazz
Tomasz Stańko: 8 awards + Golden Fryderyk, 9 nominations,
Marcin Wasilewski (pianist): 6 awards, 8 nominations,
Piotr Wojtasik: 2 awards, 6 nominations,
Andrzej Jagodzinski: 2 awards, 4 nominations,
Henryk Miśkiewicz: 1 award, 8 nominations.
Jarek Smietana: 1 award, 6 nominations.

Best foreign album
This category is particularly interesting as it reflects the Polish public's reception of international artists. The award was last given out in 2012 and the awardees were:

1994: Pink Floyd – The Division Bell
1995: Queen – Made in Heaven
1996: George Michael – Older
1997: Rolling Stones – Bridges To Babylon
1998: Madonna – Ray of Light
1999: Santana – Supernatural
2000: U2 – All That You Can't Leave Behind
2001: Leonard Cohen – Ten New Songs
2002: Red Hot Chili Peppers – By The Way
2003: Dido – Life for Rent
2004: Prince – Musicology
2005: Coldplay – X & Y
2006: Red Hot Chili Peppers – Stadium Arcadium
2008: Foo Fighters – Echoes, Silence, Patience & Grace
2009: Erykah Badu – New Amerykah, Part One
2010: Alice in Chains – Black Gives Way to Blue
2011: Kings of Leon – Come Around Sundown
2012: Adele – 21

See also 
Music of Poland
List of Polish music artists

References

External links 
 ZPAV Official Website
 Fryderyk Website

Polish music awards
Polish awards
European music awards
Awards established in 1994
1994 establishments in Poland
Classical music awards